The World Association of Chefs' Societies (WACS), is a global network of chefs associations first founded in October 1928 at the Sorbonne in Paris. At that first congress there were 65 delegates from 17 countries, representing 36 national and international associations, and the venerable August Escoffier was named the first Honorary President of WACS. Today, this global body has 72 official chefs associations as members.  The biennial congress is a hallmark tradition of WACS and has been organized in over 20 cities across the world throughout its illustrious 74-year history, WACS is managed by an elected presidential body consisting of the WACS president, vice president, treasurer, secretary general and ambassador honorary president, as well as a board of continental directors that look after the regions of Asia, Europe, Africa, the Pacific and the Americas. A separate committee manages all culinary competition-related affairs.

History
End of 19th Century  Contact between various chef associations established.
1919 International labour office opens in Geneva, Switzerland
1920 Swiss cook federation introduces the idea of an international chef association in May.
1928 WACS established in Sorbonne, Paris.August Escoffier appointed as the first honorary president.
1930 Congress held in Paris, France
1936 Congress held in Nice, France
1939/45 WWII breaks out and contact between WACS members are suspended
1949 SKV secretary W. Salzmann and the Swiss cook federation reinstate WACS
1951 Congress held in Frankfurt, Germany. Switzerland assumes WACS presidency
1954 Congress held in Berne, Switzerland
1956 Congress held in Frankfurt, Germany. Austria assumes WACS presidency
1958 Congress held in Brussels, Belgium
1960 Congress held in Vienna, Austria. Germany assumes WACS presidency
1962 Congress held in Stockholm, Sweden
1964 Congress held in Frankfurt, Germany. Switzerland assumes WACS presidency
1966 Congress held in Tel Aviv, Israel
1968 WACS celebrates its 40th anniversary. Congress held in Geneva, Switzerland. Austria assumes WACS presidency
1970 Congress held in Budapest, Hungary
1972 Congress held in Frankfurt, Germany. German cook federation takes over presidency
1974 Congress held in Banff, Canada. Landmark meeting between members from different continents. Emile Perrin is selected to honorary presidents
1976 Congress held in Frankfurt, Germany. France assumes WACS presidency
1978 Congress held in Paris, France
1980 Congress in Rome, Italy. Canada assumes WACS presidency
1982 Congress in Vienna, Austria and Budapest, Hungary
1984 Congress in Orlando, USA. Canada retains WACS presidency
1986 Congress held in Ljubljana, Slovenia
1988 WACS celebrates its 60th anniversary. Congress held in Johannesburg, South Africa. Germany assumes WACS presidency
1990 Congress held in Singapore
1992 Congress held in Frankfurt, Germany. USA assumes WACs presidency
1994 Congress held in Stavanger, Norway
1996 Congress held in Jerusalem, Israel. South Africa assumes WACS presidency
1998 WACS celebrates its 70th anniversary. Congress held in Melbourne, Australia
2000 Congress in Maastricht, Netherlands. Germany assumes WACS presidency
2002 Congress held in Kyoto, Japan
2004 Congress held in Dublin, Ireland. USA assumes WACS presidency
2006 Congress held in Auckland, New Zealand
2008 Congress held in Dubai, UAE. Iceland assumes WACS presidency

2017 Historical Committee Established by World President Thomas Gugler

See also
 Culinary Arts
 Bocuse d'Or
 International Exhibition of Culinary Art

External links
 World Association of Chefs' Societies

International professional associations
Culinary professional associations
Organizations established in 1928